Damansara may refer to:
Damansara, Selangor, a mukim of the Petaling district, state of Selangor, Malaysia

Constituencies
, a federal constituency in Selangor, Malaysia
, a former federal constituency in the Federal Territories, Malaysia
Damansara Utama (state constituency), a state constituency in Selangor, Malaysia 
Kota Damansara (state constituency), a state constituency in Selangor, Malaysia

Other places
Damansara River, a river in the state of Selangor, Malaysia
Kota Damansara, a suburb in Sungai Buloh subdistrict of Petaling Jaya city
Damansara Jaya
Damansara Perdana
Kwasa Damansara
Mutiara Damansara
Bandar Sri Damansara
Ara Damansara
Damansara Town Centre
Bukit Damansara
Bandar Damansara Kuantan
Taman Damansara Aliff
 3 Damansara Shopping Mall  
 Jalan Damansara

See also